Shakti Gawain  (30 September 1948 – 11 November 2018) was a New Age and personal development author. Her books have sold over 10 million copies.

Background
Born Carol Louisa Gawain, she graduated from the University of California with a degree in fine arts and dance in the mid 1970s.

Gawain's best known book is Creative Visualization: Use the Power of Your Imagination to Create What You Want in Life (1978). It has been a bestselling book for nearly 40 years. The book was said to have inspired Des'ree's 1994 hit song "You Gotta Be". Gawain was the co-founder, with Marc Allen, of New World Library Publishing Company and founder of Nataraj Publishing, a division of New World Library.

Gawain and her husband, Jim Burns, divided their time between California and Hawaii. Her father was a professor at a military academy in Northern California. Her mother, Elizabeth M. Gawain (1921—2017 ), was a city planner for HUD in Washington DC in the 1970s.

Publications
 "Creative Visualization" (1978)
 Living in the Light: A Guide to Personal and Planetary Transformation (1985)
 Developing Intuition: Practical Guidance for Daily Life (1987)
 Contacting Your Inner Guide: Step-By-Step Guided Meditations Designed to Help You Make Choices That Are Right for You (1989)
 Return to the Garden (1989)
 Awakening: A Daily Guide to Conscious Living (1991)
 Every Moment: A Journal with Affirmations (1992)
 Meditations: Creative Visualization and Meditation Exercises to Enrich Your Life (1992)
 The Path of Transformation: How Healing Ourselves Can Change the World (1993)
 The Four Levels of Healing: A Guide to Balancing the Spiritual, Mental, Emotional, and Physical Aspects of Life (1996)
 Creative Visualization Meditations (1996)
 Creating True Prosperity (1997)
 Creative Visualization and Transformation (1997)
 Partnering: A New Kind of Relationship (2000)
 Reflections in the Light: Daily Thoughts and Affirmations (2003)
 Create Your Own Affirmations: A Creative Visualization Kit (2003)
 The Millionaire Course: A Visionary Plan for Creating the Life of Your Dreams (2003)
Living in the Light: Follow Your Inner Guidance to Create a New Life and a New World (2011)

References

External links
 Shakti Gawain's Official Website
 "New Age Author Balances Life Like the Rest of Us" Miami Herald 
 New-Age "Author Gawain Goes "Back to the Garden" Los Angeles Daily News 
 Shakti Gawain Find a grave

1948 births
2018 deaths
American environmentalists
American self-help writers
American spiritual writers
New Age writers